Langhorne McCook Bond (March 11, 1937 - January 29, 2022) was the Administrator of the U.S. Federal Aviation Administration from 1977 to 1981 under President Jimmy Carter. He is the son of William Langhorne Bond.

Bond died on January 29, 2022, aged 84.

Biography

Bond was born in Shanghai, China. 

In 1955, he graduated from Episcopal High School in Alexandria, Virginia in the same class as engineer and defense contractor Ted Mollegen. He and Mollegen were a year behind John McCain in high school.

Bond holds degrees from Queen's College, London, McGill University and a law degree from the University of Virginia where he was a brother of The Sigma Phi Society.

Career
He was also Secretary of the Illinois Department of Transportation, Chief of Staff for the U.S. Department of Transportation Secretary Alan S. Boyd and president of the American Association of State Highway and Transportation Officials (AASHTO).

Awards and recognition
 Glen A. Gilbert Memorial Award, Air Traffic Control Association in recognition of his contributions to aviation safety (1999)

References

External links
1976 Interview
Current Position

1937 births
2022 deaths
Administrators of the Federal Aviation Administration
 Episcopal High School (Alexandria, Virginia) alumni
State cabinet secretaries of Illinois
McGill University alumni
Carter administration personnel